Armin Kerer (born 27 June 1972) is a retired Italian javelin thrower. His most notable victories were national titles in 1998 and 2000, but his personal best performance was achieved in Brixen on 18 September 1999, when he threw 80.25 metres. He represented the sports club SSV Brixen.

National titles
Armin Kerer has won 3 times the individual national championship.
2 wins in Javelin throw (1998, 2000)
1 win in Javelin throw (1996) at the Italian Winter Throwing Championships

See also
 Italian all-time lists - Javelin throw

References

External links
 

1972 births
Living people
Sportspeople from Brixen
Italian male javelin throwers
Athletics competitors of Fiamme Gialle